Rohmooa is a genus of flowering plant in the family Apiaceae. Its only species is Rohmooa kirmzii, endemic to Nepal. The genus and species were first described in 2002.

References

Apioideae
Monotypic Apioideae genera